is a Japanese manufacturer of massage chairs. Based in Osaka, Japan, Inada was founded in 1962 by Nichimu Inada and invented the first automatic shiatsu massage chair. Mr. Meishoku Kim is Inada's director of development.

Much of their technological development is done in their main headquarters in Osaka. The main factory is located in Nawa, a small town in the Tottori prefecture of Japan.

In 2001 Inada released the i.1 and the H.9 massage chairs. The H.9 was a Time magazine's Invention of the Year and became a bestseller in Japan. In 2003 the D.1 was released, and in 2008 Inada released the Sogno DreamWave, designed by Toshiyuki Kita.

The Sogno DreamWave (HCP-10001A) received 2009 Consumer Electronics Show (CES) Innovation Honors and was a 2009 American Society of Furniture Designers (ASFD) Pinnacle Award finalist. In 2010, Inada received two additional CES Innovations Honors for the Inada CUBE in the Home Appliance Category and the Doctor's Choice massage chair in the Health and Wellness Category.

References

External links 

 

Manufacturing companies of Japan
Robotics companies of Japan
Companies based in Osaka Prefecture
Manufacturing companies established in 1962
1962 establishments in Japan
Japanese brands
Robotics in Japan